Alice Nomvula Ponco is a South African politician who has represented the African National Congress (ANC) in the Eastern Cape Provincial Legislature since 2009, excepting a fortnight's hiatus in 2019.

Political career 
She was elected to the legislature in the 2009 general election, ranked 42nd on the ANC's provincial party list, and re-elected in the 2014 general election, ranked 39th. In the next general election in 2019, she was placed 45th on the party list and therefore did not immediately secure election to one of the 44 seats won by the ANC; however, she was sworn in shortly after the election, on 3 June 2019, filling an early casual vacancy in the legislature.

References

External links 

 

African National Congress politicians
Living people
Year of birth missing (living people)
Members of the Eastern Cape Provincial Legislature
21st-century South African politicians
21st-century South African women politicians